Aubrey Christina Plaza (born June 26, 1984) is an American actress, comedian, and producer. She starred as April Ludgate on the NBC sitcom Parks and Recreation from 2009–2015, and featured in the FX drama series Legion (2017–2019). In 2022, she starred in the second season of the HBO anthology series The White Lotus, for which she received a Screen Actors Guild Award and a nomination for a Golden Globe Award.

After beginning her career performing improv and sketch comedy at the Upright Citizens Brigade Theater, Plaza had her first leading film role in Safety Not Guaranteed (2012). She has also appeared in the films Mystery Team (2009), Funny People (2009), Scott Pilgrim vs. the World (2010), The To Do List (2013), Life After Beth (2014), Mike and Dave Need Wedding Dates (2016), Child's Play (2019), and Happiest Season (2020). Plaza has produced and starred in the films The Little Hours (2017), Ingrid Goes West (2017), Black Bear (2020), and Emily the Criminal (2022).

Early life and education
Plaza was born in Wilmington, Delaware, to Bernadette, an attorney, and David Plaza, a financial advisor. She has two younger sisters, Renee and Natalie.

Plaza was named after the song "Aubrey" by Bread. Her paternal grandfather, Ismael, was born in Arecibo, Puerto Rico, and moved to the mainland US when he was 17 years old. Her mother is of Irish and English descent. She has also stated that she has Taíno ancestry.

Plaza has stated: "I'm half-Puerto Rican. But, yeah, I have a huge family and tons of cousins in Puerto Rico." She grew up "very Catholic in a very Catholic household". She graduated from Ursuline Academy, an all-girls Catholic school, in 2002. In high school, she was student council president and participated in productions with the Wilmington Drama League. She studied film at New York University's Tisch School of the Arts, graduating in 2006.

Career

2006–2015: Beginnings and Parks and Recreation 

Plaza had many internships and worked as an NBC page. Plaza has performed improv and sketch comedy at the Upright Citizens Brigade Theater since 2004. She also performed stand-up and has appeared at the Laugh Factory and The Improv.

Plaza starred in the online series The Jeannie Tate Show and as Robin Gibney in ESPN's Mayne Street. She appeared in the first episode of "Terrible Decisions with Ben Schwartz" on Funny or Die.

She played Seth Rogen's love interest, Daisy, in 2009's Funny People, directed by Judd Apatow. She appeared in Scott Pilgrim vs. the World and Derrick Comedy's Mystery Team, which debuted at 2009 Sundance. She appeared in a CollegeHumor short alongside Jason Bateman and Will Arnett.

She played April Ludgate in Parks and Recreation from 2009 to 2015. She received universal praise throughout the entire show for her performance as the deadpan employee, being referred to as one of the show's breakout characters.

On March 12, 2010, Plaza performed at "A Night of 140 Tweets: A Celebrity Tweetathon for Haiti", produced by Rob Huebel, Paul Scheer, Ben Stiller, and Mike Rosenstein, at the Upright Citizens Brigade Theatre in Los Angeles.

In 2011 she appeared on Portlandia. Plaza appeared as a guest judge during a roast segment on The Next Food Network Star in 2011. She appeared in Episode 199 of the WTF with Marc Maron podcast. She also had a recurring role as "the Princess" in the comedic sci-fi web series Troopers on CollegeHumor.

In 2012, she was featured in Father John Misty's music video for the song "Hollywood Forever Cemetery Sings" from the album Fear Fun and in 2014 she was in Cassorla's "Bona Fide" video where she also made her saxophone-playing debut.

In 2012, Plaza earned her first starring role in a major film, alongside Mark Duplass, in the comedy, Safety Not Guaranteed. Plaza played Darius, a jaded intern who answers a curious want ad "seeking a companion for a time traveling adventure". Her performance in the film was critically acclaimed.

She won the award for Breakthrough Performance (Female) at the 2012 Young Hollywood Awards (YHA).

During a 2012 shooting of an episode of Parks and Recreation at the White House, she met then-Vice President Joe Biden and stole his notes about her from his desk.

In 2013, she had the leading female role as Sacagawea in Drunk History episode "Nashville" in the segment on Lewis and Clark Expedition.

In 2013, she also had the starring role in the CBS Film The To Do List. In an impromptu attempt to promote this film, Plaza ran onto the stage and grabbed Will Ferrell's MTV Movie award for "Comedic Genius" with the film's name written across her chest and a drink in hand, this resulted in her being ejected from the studio lot at which the ceremony was held.

At the 2014 Sundance Film Festival, Plaza's film, Life After Beth, which was written and directed by her now-husband Jeff Baena, premiered.

Plaza also voiced Grumpy Cat in the Lifetime Network's original movie Grumpy Cat's Worst Christmas Ever (2014).

2016–present: Legion and further film roles 

She starred in Mike and Dave Need Wedding Dates alongside Zac Efron, Anna Kendrick and Adam DeVine. The film was released on July 8, 2016. Her role as the rebellious Tatiana earned her critical praise.

In 2016, she was a guest star on HarmonQuest, as a gnome named "Hawaiian Coffee" and portrayed Aaron Burr in the "Hamilton" episode of Drunk History. She also provided a guest voice for the SpongeBob SquarePants episode "Mall Girl Pearl" with Betty White.

She first played the role of Cat Adams, a contract killer, in Season 11 of the CBS television show Criminal Minds. She returned to the role in Seasons 12 and 15.

In 2017, Plaza both starred in and produced two films, The Little Hours and Ingrid Goes West. It was announced that she would star in indie comedy An Evening With Beverly Luff Linn in 2018.

Plaza starred as both Amahl Farouk / Shadow King and Lenny Busker in the FX series Legion from 2017 to 2019.

In both 2019 and 2020, Plaza hosted the Independent Spirit Awards.

In 2019, she starred in Child's Play, a reboot of the 1988 film, as Karen Barclay, Andy's mother who brings home a killer doll, Chucky.

In 2020, Plaza produced and starred in independent film Black Bear and played a large role in Happiest Season as well.

In 2021, Plaza wrote a children's book, The Legend of the Christmas Witch, along with co-author Dan Murphy and illustrator Julia Iredale.

Plaza produced and starred in the film Emily the Criminal, which premiered at the 2022 Sundance Film Festival. She also appears in the film Spin Me Round, which premiered at the South by Southwest film festival in 2022.

In January 2022, it was announced that Plaza would star in the second season of the HBO series The White Lotus. Plaza plays Harper, a lawyer vacationing in Sicily with her husband, Ethan, played by Will Sharpe.

On August 25, 2022, Little Demon premiered on FXX. The series stars Plaza (who is also an executive producer), with Danny DeVito and Lucy DeVito.

On October 16, 2022, Plaza was given the Artist of Distinction Award at the Newport Beach Film Festival.

In November 2022, Plaza was cast in an undisclosed role, potentially as a coven member, in the Disney+ series Agatha: Coven of Chaos, set in the Marvel Cinematic Universe.

Personal life 

Plaza has been in a relationship with writer and director Jeff Baena since 2011. In May 2021, Plaza revealed that she and Baena are married, referring to him as her husband in an Instagram post.

In a 2016 interview with The Advocate, she stated: "Girls are into me—that's no secret. Hey, I'm into them, too. I fall in love with girls and guys. I can't help it."

Plaza suffered a stroke when she was 20 years old that caused temporary paralysis and temporary expressive aphasia. A couple of years later, she had a transient ischemic attack while on the set of Parks and Recreation.

Filmography

Film

Television

Music videos

Awards and nominations

Notes

References

External links 

 
 

1984 births
21st-century American comedians
21st-century American actresses
Actresses from Wilmington, Delaware
American bisexual actors
American film actresses
American film producers
American people of English descent
American people of Irish descent
American people of Puerto Rican descent
American television actresses
American voice actresses
American women comedians
American women film producers
Bisexual actresses
Catholics from Delaware
Comedians from Delaware
Film producers from Delaware
Hispanic and Latino American actresses
Independent Spirit Award winners
Living people
LGBT Hispanic and Latino American people
LGBT Roman Catholics
Outstanding Performance by an Ensemble in a Drama Series Screen Actors Guild Award winners
Tisch School of the Arts alumni
Upright Citizens Brigade Theater performers